"Still..." is a song recorded by Japanese-American singer-songwriter Ai featuring Japanese hip hop artist AK-69. It was released on June 30, 2010, by Island Records and Universal Sigma as the second single from Ai's eighth studio album, The Last Ai.

Background 
"Still..." was announced on May 10, 2010 as the second single in celebration of Ai's tenth anniversary in the music industry. The B-side of the single was also announced, "For My Sister" featuring Judith Hill. A music video was released on Universal Music Japan's YouTube channel prior to the physical and digital release of the single.

In an interview with Barks, Ai said the theme of the song was to "face our dreams".

Track listing

Charts 
"Still..." debuted and peaked at number 15 on the Japan Oricon Singles chart, charting for five weeks. On the Billboard Japan Hot 100, the song debuted and peaked at number 27, charting for one week.

Footnotes

References 
2010 singles
2010 songs
Ai (singer) songs
Songs written by Ai (singer)
Island Records singles

Universal Sigma singles